Samuel Jay Field  (October 12, 1848–October 28, 1904) was an American professional baseball player who played in Major League Baseball (MLB) for the Philadelphia Centennials, Washington Nationals, and Cincinnati Reds in 1875 and 1876. He was primarily a catcher.

Early life and amateur career
Field was born in Philadelphia in 1848. During the last two years of the American Civil War, he served in the United States Navy aboard the USS Richmond.

He began playing baseball in 1865, prior the formation of professional leagues. During the early years, he played for a Philadelphia team and caught for Cherokee Fisher. He played for 15 years and was regarded as "one of the leading baseball players" of his section of the country. The Sporting Life called him "one of the best catchers of his time."

Professional career
During the 1875 season, Field appeared in three games for the Philadelphia Centennials and five games with the Washington Nationals of the National Association of Professional Base Ball Players. In 1876, he played in four games for the Cincinnati Reds of the National League, which were his last appearances in the major leagues. In 1877, Field played for the minor league Buffalo Bisons of the League Alliance until he suffered a season-ending thumb fracture in August. Later in life, Field played for the Reading Actives, of whom he was a part owner.

Personal life and death
Field's younger brother, Jim Field, also played in the major leagues.

In his later years, Field was a fire chief and the proprietor of the Central Hotel in Sinking Spring, Pennsylvania. He died in Sinking Spring in 1904.

References

External links

1848 births
1904 deaths
Baseball players from Philadelphia
Washington Nationals (NA) players
Philadelphia Centennials players
Cincinnati Reds (1876–1879) players
19th-century baseball players
Auburn (minor league baseball) players
Buffalo (minor league baseball) players